A leadership election was held in the Liberal Democratic Party of Japan on 22 September 2008 after the incumbent party leader and Prime Minister of Japan Yasuo Fukuda announced that he would resign on 1 September 2008, only 11 months after taking office on 25 September 2007 following a leadership election on 23 September 2007. Taro Aso, who had lost to Fukuda in the 2007 leadership election, was widely seen as the frontrunner to replace him, and announced on 2 September 2008 he was ready to take over as party leader. Aso won the leadership election against four opponents, receiving 67% of the vote.

It was reported that Yuriko Koike, a former defence chief who is seen as close to former Prime Minister Junichiro Koizumi, might stand against Aso; in that case, the LDP leadership election would be a decision between the conservative traditionalist Aso and the unorthodox reformist Koike. Economics minister Kaoru Yosano and former transport minister Nobuteru Ishihara, the son of the controversial right-wing nationalist governor of Tokyo Shintarō Ishihara, also indicated they might run, as did  former defence minister Shigeru Ishiba, senior vice foreign minister Ichita Yamamoto and former science and economic minister Yasufumi Tanahashi. Campaigning began on 10 September 2008; a total of 528 people are eligible to vote (387 Diet members and 141 prefectural representatives).

To stand in the election, candidates had to gather twenty signatures from electors. Aso formally declared his candidacy on 5 September 2008, and Koike on 8 September 2008. Yosano, Ishiba and Ishihara also filed to run, while Yamamoto and Tanahashi decided not to stand for the leadership. Koizumi announced he would support and vote for Koike.

By election day, Aso had secured the votes of at least 60% of the electors and was assumed to win the election in the first round.

Aso went on to win the election by a landslide 351 votes. Yosano got 66 votes, Koike 46, Ishihara 37 and Ishiba 25. Aso was sworn in as Prime Minister on 24 September 2008. Some speculated that a general election would be called on 3 October for 26 October 2008 following the leadership election, but this failed to materialise.

Results

 2 invalid votes

Past leadership elections
2007 Liberal Democratic Party (Japan) leadership election

References

Liberal
Political party leadership elections in Japan
Liberal Democratic Party (Japan)
Indirect elections
Liberal Democratic Party (Japan) leadership election
Liberal